The 2017 Irving Tennis Classic was a professional tennis tournament played on hard courts. It was the sixth edition of the tournament which was part of the 2017 ATP Challenger Tour. It took place in Irving, United States between 14 and 19 March 2017.

Singles main-draw entrants

Seeds

 1 Rankings as of March 6, 2017.

Other entrants
The following players received wildcards into the singles main draw:
  Benjamin Becker
  James McGee
  Tim Smyczek
  Sergiy Stakhovsky

The following players received entry into the singles main draw as alternates:
  Aljaž Bedene
  Jared Donaldson
  Santiago Giraldo
  Konstantin Kravchuk
  Lukáš Lacko
  Frances Tiafoe

The following players received entry from the qualifying draw:
  Denis Kudla
  Matwé Middelkoop
  Andrey Rublev
  Lukáš Rosol

The following player received entry into the singles main draw as a lucky loser:
  Teymuraz Gabashvili

Champions

Singles

 Aljaž Bedene def.  Mikhail Kukushkin 6–4, 3–6, 6–1.

Doubles

 Marcus Daniell /  Marcelo Demoliner def.  Oliver Marach /  Fabrice Martin 6–3, 6–4.

References

External links
Official Website

Irving Tennis Classic
Irving Tennis Classic